The Calderdale Royal Hospital is a hospital situated in the English town of Halifax. It is located in the suburb of Salterhebble and provides general services, emergency services and some specialist services. It is managed by Calderdale and Huddersfield NHS Foundation Trust.

History
The hospital, which replaced the Royal Halifax Infirmary, was procured under a Private Finance Initiative contract in 1998. The new hospital was built by Bovis Lend Lease. The cost of building the hospital, originally budgeted at £34.8 million in 1994, was £103 million by 2001. It started providing services to patients in April 2001 and was officially opened by Princess Anne on 15 March 2004. Facilities management services are provided by ISS.

Proposals to close the Accident and Emergency Department in February 2016 provoked a demonstration of 5,000 people in Huddersfield and a petition signed by 60,000 people against it.

See also
 List of hospitals in England

References

Hospitals established in 2004
Hospitals in West Yorkshire
Buildings and structures in Halifax, West Yorkshire
NHS hospitals in England